The discography of German disco group Boney M. includes 8 studio albums, about 25 singles (released during the group's active years), and numerous compilation albums.

Albums

Studio albums

Charting and/or certified compilation albums

Singles

Videography
 Boney M – VHS, Mirror Vision (1981) 
 Gold – VHS/VCD (in Hong Kong) (1993)
 Gold DVD (2001, Europe)
 Greatest Hits (2001, UK)
 Special Edition (2002, South Korea)
 Special Edition EP (2003, UK)
 The Magic of Boney M. (2006)
 Fantastic Boney M. – On Stage and on the Road (2007)
 Legendary TV Performances (2010)
 Diamonds (2015)

Songs that were re-worked into Boney M. titles
Frank Farian's right hand Hans-Jörg Mayer (aka Georg Reyam) sought out songs from all over the world, often public domain (non-copyrighted) folk tunes but as well works from other musicians/composers (usually not credited) and rewrote them for Boney M.

Borrowed themes
 The first Boney M. recording "Baby Do You Wanna Bump" (1975) is based on Prince Buster's "Al Capone" (1967).
 "Motherless Child" (1977) is a rewrite of "Sometimes I Feel Like a Motherless Child".
 "Ma Baker" is a rewrite of a Tunisian traditional song, Sidi Mansur.
 "Brown Girl in the Ring" (1978) is a traditional Caribbean nursery rhyme and uses an arrangement from Malcolm's Locks "Brown Girl" (1975).
 "Nightflight to Venus" (1978) with its characteristic drums, the rock guitar theme, and the march interludes, was rewritten from Cozy Powell's No. 1 hit "Dance with the Devil" (1974).
 "Rasputin" (1978) features a melody line present in both a Serbian ("Ај, русе косе цуро имаш") and Turkish traditional ("Üsküdar'a Gider İken / Kâtibim").
 "He Was a Steppenwolf" (1978) borrows arrangement-wise from The Temptations' lengthy epic "Papa Was a Rollin' Stone" (1972).
 "Dancing in the Streets" borrowed the arrangement from the Bee Gees' "You Should Be Dancing" and the hookline "Keep on dancing in the streets" is melodically similar to The Beatles' "What's the word I'm thinking of" "(The Word)"
 "Hooray! Hooray! It's a Holi-Holiday" (1979) is a rewrite of "Polly Wolly Doodle".
 "Gotta Go Home" (1979) was a rewrite of German band Nighttrain's "Hallo Bimmelbahn" (1973), while the middle-part 'Doo-doo-doop, doo doo doo doo doop' (sung by Farian in his head voice) was borrowed from The Beatles in Hello, Goodbye (1967) as 'hey-la, hey helloa'.
 "No More Chain Gang" (1979) borrows the bridge 'Then one night he laid in waiting' from folklore "St. James Infirmary Blues" and an arrangement inspired by Johnny Wakelin's "In Zaire" (1976).
 "I'm Born Again" (1979) is based on the Irish traditional "Buachaill Ón Éirne".
 "Children of Paradise" (1980) is based on Younès Mégri's "Leïli Twil" (1973).
Both "Boonoonoonoos" and "Ride to Agadir" (1981) contain a theme taken from Pink Floyd's "Another Brick in the Wall (Part 2)", "The Happiest Days of Our Lives" and "Run Like Hell" (1979).
 "Train to Skaville / That's Boonoonoonoos" (1981) is partly inspired by the No. 1 hit Pop Muzik (1979) by M (the walking bass, the rap parts, and 'Boo-Boo-Boo-Boonoonoonoos' – 'Pop Pop Pop Muzik').
 "Homeland Africa (Ship Ahoy)" (1981) borrows the chorus and lyrics from The O'Jays' "Ship Ahoy" (1973).
 "I'll Be Home for Christmas" (1981) borrows not only the title from the well-known Christmas song but also a theme from Don Williams' "Some Broken Hearts Never Mend" (1977) and also has a strong resemblance to Jona Lewie's "Stop the Cavalry" (1980).
 "Exodus (Noah's Ark 2001)" (1984) features a guitar theme borrowed from The Temptations' "Papa Was a Rollin' Stone" (1972) while the chorus borrows from Bob Marley's "Exodus" (1977).
 "Wild Planet" (1984) is based on Hungarian rock band Omega's "Ajanlott Utvonal" (1982)
 "Future World" (1984) is based on Hungarian rock band Omega's "Tízezer lépés" (10,000 Steps) (1969).
 "10 000 Lightyears" (1984) is based on "Theme From "The Persuaders"", the TV series theme song by John Barry (1971).
 "Somewhere in the World" (1984) borrows 'mood wise' from Paul McCartney's "Tug of War" (1982), and in specific the chorus line "In another world".
 "Bel Ami" (1984) features an arrangement and brass intro very similar to Mezzoforte's "Garden Party" (1983).
 "The Alibama" (1984) is reworked from a South African standard "Daar kom die Alibama".
 "Living Like a Moviestar" (1984) features a flute theme from Jeff Wayne's "The Eve of the War" (1978).
 "Eye Dance" (1985) is based on Herbie Hancock's "Doin' It" from his album Secrets (1976), written by Melvin Ragin and Ray Parker Jr.
 "Todos Buenos" (1985) borrows elements from Titanic's "Sultana" (1971) and "Mas Que Nada" by Jorge Ben (1963), the latter made famous by Sergio Mendes & Brasil '66 (1966).
 "Sample City" (1985) features the same chord pattern as "I Can't Stand the Rain" (1973), the Ann Peebles classic and a 1978 hit single for Farian's soul band Eruption.
 "Bang Bang Lulu" (1985) is a traditional folk song.

See also
 List of best-selling music artists

References

External links
 The Magic Of Boney M – Unofficial website with discography, history, biography and more.

Boney M.
Pop music group discographies
Discographies of German artists
Disco discographies